Brendan Devenney (born 1976) is an Irish Gaelic football coach, broadcaster and former player.

He played his club football for St Eunan's and also represented the Donegal county team and won the 1998 and 2001 International Rules Series with Ireland. Of a  temperament, Devenney often wandered away from the sport to play association football instead. Described by RTÉ as "one of the greatest players to have worn the Donegal jersey", Devenney was his county's "main marksman in the pre-McGuinness era".

Devenney contested ? Ulster Senior Football Championship finals with Donegal, played in an All-Ireland Senior Football Championship semi-final in 2003 and won the National Football League in 2007. He won five Donegal Senior Football Championships with his club.

In retirement, Devenney remains involved with his local club (having co-managed them to a Donegal Senior Football Championship in 2012), appears on media platforms such as Highland Radio and files a column for the Letterkenny Leader. He is also having to come to terms with Michael Murphy naming him on national television as his childhood hero. A shocked Devenney opened up on this revelation years later: "And that was back when Michael was already the fuckin' man! The fact that he has called me his hero is, probably, the most humbling thing that anyone has ever said to me". Devenney later said: "Has anyone's hero turned around and then been their hero? Because Michael would be mine. So it's come full circle".

Playing career
Devenney played for his school team, St Eunan's College.

Club
In the final of the 1999 Donegal Senior Football Championship, Devenney broke Martin McHugh's record by scoring 0–14 of his team's 1–19 to their opponents Aodh Ruadh's 1–11. Devenney punctured a lung while playing for his club against Clonoe of Tyrone in the Ulster Club SFC in 2008. He ignored his injury, sustained in the first half, and carried on until the end of the game—scoring four points and contributing to the decisive goal which won the game for his team—after which he was hospitalised. He also captained his club.

He won five Donegal SFCs as a player.

He also played for Donegal New York.

County
Devenney played senior football for Donegal despite not having played underage. His debut against Cork in the National Football League quarter-final at Croke Park in March 1998 was nothing short of sensational: he scored 2–2. Declan Bonner gave Devenney his championship debut in 1998. He played in his first Ulster Senior Football Championship final later that year, and though he lost, he received the man of the match award.

He often partnered Adrian Sweeney in Donegal's forward line.

He played in the 2003 All-Ireland Senior Football Championship semi-final against Armagh, scoring three points (all of which were frees).

Devenney had a decent game against Armagh in the 2004 Ulster final at Croke Park. He played championship football until 2005. He came back in 2007. That year, Devenney contributed to the county winning its first National Football League title in 2007, passing a late fitness test to play in the final against Mayo. However, he went off injured during the game, which Donegal won, and Kevin McMenamin replaced him. He made a substitute appearance against Armagh in the 2007 Ulster SFC quarter-final at MacCumhaill Park on 27 May that year and scored the last-minute goal which defeated the Orchard County by a single point on a scoreline of 1–9 to 1–8. However, he was excluded from the squad in 2008. He confirmed his retirement from football's top level on 29 December 2009.

Devenney never won the Ulster Senior Football Championship during his career. Shortly after his departure Donegal won an All-Ireland Senior Football title in 2012. Devenney said,  He spoke again in 2020 of the "dread" he experienced ahead of playing for Donegal against other Ulster teams.

National team
Devenney represented Ireland in the 1998 International Rules Series. He scored one over (worth three points) in the second test, which was held at Croke Park on 18 October, as Ireland won the series by an aggregate score of 128–118. He was his country's leading scorer against Australia in the 2001 International Rules Series, as Ireland romped to victory in Australia. He scored four overs in the first test, held at the Melbourne Cricket Ground on 12 October, as Ireland won 59–53. He scored two overs in the second test, held at Football Park in Adelaide on 19 October.

Association football
While playing for Donegal, Devenney would often pass the time during the 2000s by playing association football matches for League of Ireland club Finn Harps. He was involved in the 2001–02 League of Ireland Premier Division relegation playoff penalty shoot-out loss to Longford Town after Finn Harps qualified via the 2001–02 League of Ireland First Division.

In 2006, he became disillusioned and began playing association football in Northern Ireland with Portadown.

There was also Limavady United somewhere.

Devenney, however, was not sufficiently interested in the sport to take up an offer of a two-year contract with Finn Harps in 2007, preferring to play football for Donegal.

Devenney currently plays the sport for Gweedore United in the Donegal Junior Football League, an association football competition.

Post-playing career
Devenney coaches his local club and does radio commentary for the BBC. He has been critical of the qualifiers the GAA have brought into the All-Ireland Senior Football Championship, saying they have "diluted the Championship season a bit." He has also been involved in a national radio debate hosted by Marian Finucane on the topic of money. He predicted Derry would beat Donegal in the 2014 Ulster Senior Football Championship quarter-final.

DL Debate
On 10 February 2020, a weekly programme called DL Debate began airing on Highland Radio. It originated in discussion between Devenney and Oisín Kelly between games on a Sunday, with Devenney concluding that a Monday evening programme to discuss the weekend's fixtures was necessary. Devenney's guests on the first episode included John Haran, Colm Parkinson (Laois) and Ciarán Whelan (Dublin). Others in later episodes included Neil Gallagher, John Gildea, Enda McGinley (Tyrone), Rory Kavanagh, Donal Reid, Bernard Flynn (Meath), P. J. McGowan and David Brady (Mayo).

Personal life
He is the son of Paddy and Imelda Devenney. His father died of an illness in September 2022, while his sister Margaret also died  - suddenly - the next day, and the two were given a joint funeral.

Honours
Club
 Donegal Senior Football Championship: 1999, 2001, 2007, 2008, 2009

County
 National Football League: 2007

Country
 International Rules Series: 1998, 2001

Individual
 Ulster Senior Football Championship final man of the match: 1998
 All Star nomination: 2001

References

External links
 
 Brendan Devenney at gaainfo.com
 Charlie Collins is TALKING SPORT with …Brendan Devenney

1976 births
Living people
BBC sports presenters and reporters
Donegal inter-county Gaelic footballers
Donegal New York Gaelic footballers
Gaelic footballers who switched code
Gaelic football forwards
Gaelic games commentators
Gaelic games writers and broadcasters
Irish expatriate sportspeople in the United States
Irish international rules football players
People educated at St Eunan's College
People from Letterkenny
St Eunan's Gaelic footballers
Ulster inter-provincial Gaelic footballers
Finn Harps F.C. players
League of Ireland players
Limavady United F.C. players
Portadown F.C. players
NIFL Premiership players
Association footballers not categorized by position
Republic of Ireland association footballers